The Pennsylvania Auditor General election of 2020 took place on November 3, 2020. Primary elections were originally due to take place on April 28, 2020. However, following concerns regarding the coronavirus pandemic the primaries were delayed until June 2, 2020. Under the Pennsylvania Constitution incumbent Democratic Auditor General Eugene DePasquale was ineligible to seek a third consecutive term.

The Democratic Party nominated Nina Ahmad, a Bangladeshi American, while the Republicans nominated Timothy DeFoor, an African American, meaning that the victor would be the first person of color to be elected to statewide executive office in Pennsylvania.

On November 6, the Associated Press declared Timothy DeFoor the winner. DeFoor became the first Republican to win the office of Auditor General in 28 years, the first African American and person of color to win election to statewide office in Pennsylvania, and became the second African American to hold statewide office in Pennsylvania upon taking office.

Background
Historically, the Democratic Party has controlled the Auditor General's office in the modern era. Between 1960 and 2016, the Democratic nominee for Auditor General has prevailed in all but two elections. The last Republican to serve as Auditor General was Barbara Hafer, who was elected in 1988 and 1992.

Between 2000 and 2016, the nominee of the Democratic Party ran unopposed in their party's primary. However, between October 2019 and January 2020, six candidates entered the Democratic primary, becoming the largest primary field since 1996, when Bob Casey Jr. defeated three other candidates to advance to the general election.

In contrast to similar offices in other states, the Pennsylvania Auditor General's office is seen as a potential stepping stone to higher office. Bob Casey Sr. and Bob Casey Jr. held the office prior to becoming governor and U.S. Senator, respectively, and auditors general Donald A. Bailey and Jack Wagner attempted gubernatorial campaigns during or after their tenure. Hafer was the Republican nominee for governor in 1990, while still serving as auditor general. Outgoing auditor general Eugene DePasquale was also seen as having successfully used the office to raise his profile in the state, and was seen as a potential candidate for governor or U.S. Senate in 2022 prior to announcing he would run for Pennsylvania's 10th congressional district.

In 2019, the Pennsylvania General Assembly voted to reduce the budget of the auditor general's office by 10%. The cuts were seen by observers as a response to DePasquale's political activity.

Impact of COVID-19
Following the outbreak of the COVID-19 pandemic, on March 25 the Pennsylvania General Assembly voted to delay the state's primary elections from April 28 to June 2. The same act of legislation which delayed the primary also permitted counties to temporarily consolidate polling places for the primary election. In October 2019, prior to the pandemic, Governor Tom Wolf signed into law an election reform bill which allowed for postal voting. In April, it was announced that Pennsylvania residents would be able to request a postal ballot over the internet, with an application deadline of May 26.

The government encouraged postal voting in order to combat the spread of COVID-19 and maintain social distancing. Postal ballots were originally due to be received by election officials by 8 p.m. EDT on June 2. However, on June 1, Governor Wolf signed an executive order extending the deadline to June 9 for six counties, provided the ballots in question were postmarked no later than June 2. The counties impacted by the executive order were Philadelphia, Allegheny, Erie, Dauphin, Montgomery, and Delaware. In issuing the executive order, Governor Wolf's office cited both the pandemic and the ongoing protests in response to the murder of George Floyd as motivation for the extension. On June 2, a judge granted Bucks County a postal ballot extension, bringing the total number of counties granted an extension to seven.

Democratic primary

Candidates

Nominee
 Nina Ahmad, former deputy mayor of Philadelphia and candidate for Lieutenant Governor in 2018

Defeated in primary
 H. Scott Conklin, member of the Pennsylvania House of Representatives from the 77th district since 2007 and Democratic nominee for Lieutenant Governor in 2010
 Rose Davis, a certified public accountant and vice chairman of the Smithfield Township Board of Auditors
 Tracie Fountain, a certified public accountant and former employee of the Auditor General's office
 Christina Hartman, former nonprofit executive and Democratic nominee for Pennsylvania's 16th congressional district in 2016
 Michael Lamb, Controller of the City of Pittsburgh since 2008

Withdrew before primary
 Alan Butkovitz, former Philadelphia City Controller (2006–2018) and former member of the Pennsylvania House of Representatives (1991–2005)

Endorsements

Campaign
Christina Hartman became the first Democrat to officially enter the field in October 2019. She was joined later in that month by Nina Ahmad. Tracie Fountain, a longtime employee of the auditor general's office, resigned in order to mount a campaign. By January, the size of the field had swelled to seven candidates when Alan Butkovitz, the former Philadelphia City Controller, announced he was entering the race on January 23. Just eleven days later, however, Butkovitz withdrew from the race citing an intent to help Democrats win Pennsylvania in the 2020 United States presidential election.

Hartman received the endorsement of former Pennsylvania Governor Ed Rendell in December 2019. In January, Pittsburgh Controller Michael Lamb secured the endorsement of Philadelphia Mayor Jim Kenney, which Lamb later touted in an advertisement in the closing days of the campaign.

Both Lamb and Ahmad sought to portray themselves as progressives. Ahmad pledged to use the auditor general's office to tackle issues such as gun violence and cited healthcare and prescription drug costs as "a big concern". Following the onset of the COVID-19 pandemic, Ahmad also called for a pandemic preparedness audit. Lamb was described as "a vocal critic of Wall Street," and stated that his first action would be to conduct an audit of the auditor general's office itself in the name of increased transparency. Lamb also supported legalizing recreational marijuana in Pennsylvania, and highlighted his track record as Pittsburgh's top auditor.

Tracie Fountain and H. Scott Conklin highlighted the department's budget cuts in discussing their plans for the office. Fountain's campaign focused on optimizing the work of the auditor general's office in the face of those cuts, while Conklin called for programs to support independent farms and small businesses. Rose Davis highlighted her more than three decades of experience conducting audits and stated her priority would be to audit third-party contractors, particularly in the field of eldercare. Hartman expressed a desire to focus on criminal justice and school spending. Each of the candidates promised greater oversight of COVID-19 relief spending.

On March 28 and March 29, 2020, virtual meetings conducted over the Zoom teleconferencing service with Ahmad, Davis, and Fountain (all women of color) were targeted by hackers who deployed racial epithets. As of May 29, Ahmad and Lamb reportedly had the highest spending on television advertising, while Conklin, Fountain, and Hartman had no television spending. Similarly, according to reports filed with the Pennsylvania Department of State in 2020, Ahmad led the field in campaign contributions with around $428,000, followed by Lamb with approximately $158,000. Rose Davis reported the lowest value of contributions, with only around $5,000 in total receipts. Ahmad, Lamb, and Conklin were also believed to have the highest name recognition in the race. On May 30, Hartman attended a demonstration in Lancaster to protest the murder of George Floyd.

Results
As results came in on election night, Michael Lamb appeared to be in the lead. However, as a result of the implementation of postal voting and extensions granted to seven counties the race was deemed too early to call. A majority of outstanding votes were from the southeastern portion of the state, where Nina Ahmad was expected to be strongest. Ahmad pulled ahead of Lamb in the days following the election and by June 8 was perceived as the likely victor, but the race remained too close to call. Nina Ahmad claimed victory on June 11 and Michael Lamb conceded the race.

Republican primary

Candidates

Nominee
 Timothy DeFoor, Dauphin County controller

Withdrew before primary
 Cris Dush, member of the Pennsylvania House of Representatives from the 66th district since 2015 (running for State Senate)
 Dennis Stuckey, former Lancaster County commissioner

Declined
 Mike Tobash, member of the Pennsylvania House of Representatives from the 125th district

Endorsements

Campaign
Lancaster County Commissioner Dennis Stuckey, whose term expired in 2020, became the first Republican to enter the primary in November 2019. Stuckey highlighted his record as a county official and his past experience in accounting and finance. Dauphin County Controller Timothy DeFoor became the second Republican to join the field in December, followed by Cris Dush, a state legislator from Jefferson County, in January 2020. However, later in January the Republican State Committee of Pennsylvania voted to officially endorse DeFoor for the position with 199 votes, compared to 96 for Stuckey and 11 for Dush. Stuckey had previously indicated that he would not mount a campaign without party support, and subsequently withdrew from the race on January 30. On February 13, 2020, Dush withdrew from the race in order to seek a seat in the Pennsylvania State Senate, leaving DeFoor the presumptive nominee.

Results

General election

Polling

Endorsements

Results

References

Notes

Auditor General
Pennsylvania Auditor General elections
Pennsylvania